Donadoni is a surname of Italian origin. Notable people with the name include: 

 Marco Donadoni (born 1951), Italian game designer 
 Mario Donadoni (born 1979), Italian football defender
 Maurizio Donadoni (born 1958), Italian actor
 Roberto Donadoni (born 1963), Italian football midfielder and manager
 Sergio Donadoni (1914–2015), Italian Egyptologist
 

Italian-language surnames